Militant Minority: British Columbia Workers and the Rise of a New Left, 1948-72 is a 2011 book written by Ben Isitt and published by University of Toronto Press.

References

2011 non-fiction books
Canadian non-fiction books
University of Toronto Press books
Books about British Columbia